Maliuc is a commune in Tulcea County, Northern Dobruja, Romania. It is composed of four villages: Gorgova, Ilganii de Sus, Maliuc, Partizani, and Vulturu.

The commune lies on the Sulina branch of the river Danube, in the western third of the Danube Delta.

References

 

Communes in Tulcea County
Localities in Northern Dobruja